István Basilius (1549–1581) was a Hungarian Unitarian and first minister at Nagyvárad. As a writer he published: György Enyedi, Máté Toroczkai, and István Basilius. 1670. Explicationes locorum Veteris et Novi Testamenti, ex quibus Trinitatis dogma stabiliri solet.

References

1549 births
1581 deaths
Hungarian Unitarians